Dedalus Press is one of the major publishers of contemporary poetry in Ireland (with more than 150 titles currently in print).

History 
Founded in 1985 by poet and fiction writer John F. Deane, it is now run by poet and editor Pat Boran and manager Raffaela Tranchino. At present the press publishes approximately 8 new book-length publications each year, concentrating on contemporary poetry from Ireland but also regularly issuing anthologies and individual volumes by European writers in translation (often in bilingual formats).

Dedalus also represents Thomas Kinsella's Peppercanister series of pamphlets, Iggy McGovern's occasional Quaternion Press and Pat Boran's own imprint, Orange Crate Books.

According to MEAS report providing statistics for Irish poetry publications, Dedalus Press in 2018 was the joint-fourth most prolific poetry press on the Island of Ireland.

Notable poets published by the press 

Paula Meehan
Macdara Woods
Francis Harvey
Theo Dorgan
Doireann Ní Ghríofa
Gerry Murphy
Eva Bourke
Ciaran O'Driscoll

References

External links 

The Dedalus Press website
Facebook Page

Publishing companies of Ireland
Irish companies established in 1985
Irish poetry
Poetry publishers
Literary publishing companies
Book publishing companies of Ireland